Tithorea railway station is a railway station that serves the town of Kato Tithorea, Phthiotis in Central Greece. Today TrainOSE operates around 12 trains local and InterCity services to Athens, Palaiofarsalos and Thessaloniki. The station is staffed with waiting rooms available.

History
The station opened on 8 March 1904., along with the rest of the line. In 1920 the line became part of the Hellenic State Railways. In 1971, the Hellenic State Railways was reorganised into the OSE taking over responsibilities for most of Greece's rail infrastructure. In 2001 the infrastructure element of OSE was created, known as GAIAOSE; it would henceforth be responsible for the maintenance of stations, bridges and other elements of the network, as well as the leasing and the sale of railway assists. In 2005, TrainOSE was created as a brand within OSE to concentrate on rail services and passenger interface. The station closed in 2016 for renovations and track upgrades. On 20 February 2017, TrainOSE announced the start of the pilot Athens Suburban Railway route for Athens-Tithorea-Athens. While this service has yet to be implemented, local stopping services now call at Tithorea. The station reopened on 15 December 2017 and was officially inaugurated on 8 January 2018, at the same time as the rest of the Tithorea-Lianokladi section of the line In July 2022, the station began being served by Hellenic Train, the rebranded TranOSE

Facilities
The station was renovated in the period 2016–2017, with the construction of a new underground passage, shelters on the platforms, and elevators, as well as with the improvement work to the station buildings and the installation of both a modern PA system and electronic timetable boards.

Services
It is served by intercity trains between Athens and Thessaloniki. In February 2018 new services commenced on the new Tithorea - Lianokladi high-speed line.

Station layout

Gallery

References

Railway stations in Central Greece
Railway stations opened in 1904
Buildings and structures in Phthiotis